The 2011 Christy Ring Cup was the seventh season of the Christy Ring Cup since its establishment in 2005.

Teams
A total of eight teams contested the Christy Ring Cup, including seven sides from the 2010 Christy Ring Cup and one promoted team from the 2010 Nicky Rackard Cup.

Both Derry and Mayo failed to win any of their games in the 2010 Christy Ring Cup and qualified for the relegation play-off.  No match took place and both teams preserved their status for the 2011 season.  From these two teams, Mayo had the longest tenure as a Christy Ring Cup member as the team had competed in every season since the inaugural one in 2005. Derry joined the Christy Ring Cup in 2007 having won the previous year's Nicky Rackard Cup.

2010 Nicky Rackard Cup champions Armagh secured direct promotion to the Christy Ring Cup. They last competed in the competition in 2008.

Team summaries

Stadia and locations

Personnel and kits

Structure
The tournament has a double elimination format - each team played at least two games before being knocked out.
The eight teams play four Round 1 matches.
The winners in Round 1 advance to Round 2A.
The losers in Round 1 go into Round 2B.
There are two Round 2A matches.
The winners in Round 2A advance to the semifinals.
The losers in Round 2A go into the quarter-finals.
There are two Round 2B matches.
The winners in Round 2B advance to the quarter-finals.
The losers in Round 2B go into the relegation playoff.
The losers of the relegation playoff are relegated to the Nicky Rackard Cup for 2012.
There are two quarter-final matches between the Round 2A losers and Round 2B winners.
The winners of the quarter-finals advance to the semifinals.
The losers of the quarter-finals are eliminated.
There are two semifinal matches between the Round 2A winners and the quarter-final winners.
The winners of the semifinals advance to the final.
The losers of the semifinals are eliminated.
The winners of the final win the Christy Ring Cup for 2011 and were given the option of being promoted to the Liam MacCarthy Cup 2012, Kerry however decided to remain in the Christy Ring Cup in 2012.

Fixtures

Round 1

Round 2A

Round 2B

Quarter-finals

Semifinals

Final

{{16TeamBracket-Compact-NoSeeds-Byes
| RD1=Round 1Round 2B
| RD2=Round 2AQuarter-finals
| RD3=Semi-finals
| RD4=Final

| team-width=100px
| score-width=35px

| RD1-team01=Derry
| RD1-score01=2-17
| RD1-team02=Down
| RD1-score02=1-13

| RD1-team03=Wicklow
| RD1-score03=1-19
| RD1-team04=Mayo
| RD1-score04=1-17

| RD1-team07=Kildare
| RD1-score07=1-20
| RD1-team08=Armagh
| RD1-score08=2-10

| RD1-team09=Mayo
| RD1-score09=0-06
| RD1-team10=Down| RD1-score10=1-20| RD1-team13=Kildare
| RD1-score13=1-21
| RD1-team14=Kerry| RD1-score14=1-25| RD1-team15=Meath| RD1-score15=2-21| RD1-team16=Armagh
| RD1-score16=1-17

| RD2-team01=Derry
| RD2-score01=2-11
| RD2-team02=Wicklow| RD2-score02=3-16| RD2-team03=Derry
| RD2-score03=1-13
| RD2-team04=Kildare| RD2-score04=4-18| RD2-team05=Down| RD2-score05=1-18| RD2-team06=Meath
| RD2-score06=1-07

| RD2-team07=Kerry| RD2-score07=1-20| RD2-team08=Meath
| RD2-score08=1-17

| RD3-team01=Wicklow| RD3-score01=3-11| RD3-team02=Kildare
| RD3-score02=2-11

| RD3-team03=Down
| RD3-score03=1-17
| RD3-team04=Kerry| RD3-score04=1-18| RD4-team01=Wicklow
| RD4-score01=2-8
| RD4-team02=Kerry
| RD4-score02=2-21}}

Scoring
Widest winning margin: 17 pointsDown 1-20 - 0-06 Armagh (Round 2B)
Most goals in a match: 5Wicklow 3-16 - 2-11 Derry (Round 2A)
Kildare 4-18 - 1-13 Derry (Quarter-final)
Wicklow 3-11 - 2-11 Kildare (Semifinal)
Most points in a match: 46Kerry 1-25 - 1-21 Kildare (Round 1)
Most goals by one team in a match: 4Kildare 4-18 - 1-13 Derry (Quarter-final)
Most goals scored by a losing team: 2Derry 2-11 - 3-16 Wicklow (Round 2A)
Wicklow 3-11 - 2-11 Kildare (Semifinal)
Most points scored by a losing team: 21'''
Kildare 1-21 - 1-25 Kerry (Round 1)

Top scorers

Season

Single game

See also
 Christy Ring Cup Champion 15 Awards

External links
2011 Christy Ring Cup fixtures and results

Christy Ring Cup
Christy Ring Cup